Sarah Phelps is a British television screenwriter, radio writer, playwright and television producer. She is best known for her work on EastEnders, a number of BBC serial adaptations including Agatha Christie's The Witness For the Prosecution, And Then There Were None, Ordeal by Innocence,  The ABC Murders and The Pale Horse; Charles Dickens's Great Expectations and Oliver Twist; and J. K. Rowling's The Casual Vacancy, and work with the Royal Shakespeare Company.

Career
Phelps has written over 90 episodes of EastEnders, including the return of Den Watts and his final demise, less than two years later. She wrote the screenplay for the BBC's 2011 Christmas costume drama adaptation Great Expectations and the World War One drama series The Crimson Field. The show was cancelled after one series due to middling ratings.

In 2015, she wrote a television adaptation of J. K. Rowling's The Casual Vacancy. In 2020, BBC One commissioned The Sixth Commandment, a true crime drama by Phelps about the murder of Peter Farquhar.

Christie adaptations
In 2015, Phelps's adaptation of Agatha Christie's And Then There Were None was broadcast. Reviewing it for The Daily Telegraph, Tim Martin found that, "The final episode of this bloody adaptation by Sarah Phelps did splendid justice to Christie's lightless universe, presenting an isolated mansion full of leaking corpses, in which the characters – quite understandably – freaked out in ways that no previous adaptation has countenanced."In 2016  The Witness For the Prosecution went to air, with a script based on the original short story rather than the later play on which other screen adaptations have been based.

In April 2018, another of Agatha Christie's novels adapted by Phelps was broadcast on BBC One. Ordeal by Innocence had been pulled from the Christmas scheduling on BBC One after one of the leading actors in the drama miniseries was accused of sexual assault. The programme was re-shot with a new actor, Christian Cooke, replacing Ed Westwick.

In June 2018 it was announced that the BBC were filming a Phelps adaptation of Agatha Christie’s ABC Murders starring John Malkovich as Hercule Poirot. In June 2019 it was announced that Phelps would write an adaptation of The Pale Horse.

Filmography

Other work
Phelps's radio work includes Vital Signs II, Cardamom, The Collected Works of Billy the Kid and The Compass Rose: A Tattoo Lexicon. Phelps also wrote for the World Service Soap opera Westway before joining the BBC in 2002. Her theatre projects include Tube, Angela Carter, The Subtle Art of Boiling Lobsters, Amaretti Angels and Modern Dance for Beginners''.

References

External links

Sarah Phelps's agency CV
BBC Writersroom interview

Living people
Year of birth missing (living people)
Place of birth missing (living people)
British women dramatists and playwrights
British soap opera writers
British television writers
English television writers
British women television writers
English screenwriters
Women soap opera writers
20th-century English women writers
20th-century English dramatists and playwrights